Robert Lloyd Stanton (born March 8, 1963) is an American actor, director and playwright.

Early life
Stanton was born on March 8, 1963, in San Antonio, Texas, and raised in Annandale, Virginia, the son of federal workers Billie Loree (née Baker) and Lloyd Winter Stanton, Jr.

Career

Theater
Stanton trained at NYU's Tisch School of the Arts Graduate Acting Program and began his acting career in Joseph Papp's production of the play Measure for Measure at the Delacorte Theater in 1985. He was in the resident company of the American Repertory Theater in Cambridge, Massachusetts, from 1989 to 1991.

He appeared on Broadway in James Graham’s Ink, George Bernard Shaw’s Saint Joan, John Guare's A Free Man of Color, Friedrich Schiller's Mary Stuart, Tom Stoppard's The Coast of Utopia, and Alan Ayckbourn's A Small Family Business. Two-dozen Off Broadway credits include David Lindsay-Abaire's Fuddy Meers, A. R. Gurney's A Cheever Evening, and Caryl Churchill's Owners and Traps. He won an Obie Award and a Clarence Derwent Award for his performance in David Ives's All in the Timing in 1994. He directed the premiere of Ives's play Don Juan in Chicago Off-Broadway in 1995.

In 2008 and 2009, he appeared in Off-Broadway productions of Love Child, a 22-character farce for two actors, with his co-writer, Daniel H. Jenkins.

In March and April 2012, he appeared in the Eugene O'Neill play Strange Interlude at the Shakespeare Theatre Company, in the role of Charles Marsden; he returned in January 2016 to play Mr. Puff in Jeffrey Hatcher's adaptation of Richard Brinsley Sheridan's The Critic and Moon in Stoppard's The Real Inspector Hound on a double-bill, winning the company's Emery Battis Award for his performances.

Film and television roles
Stanton made a brief appearance in the 1988 thriller The House on Carroll Street. In 1992, he appeared in the films A League of Their Own and Bob Roberts. In 1993, he appeared in his first major supporting role, playing Henry Mitchell in Dennis the Menace for writer-producer John Hughes.

He played John Chapman in the 1994–95 television show The Cosby Mysteries.

He later appeared in a variety of films, including Don't Drink the Water (1994 film), Striptease, Washington Square, Red Corner, Next Stop Wonderland,  Mercury Rising, The Quiet American,  Head of State, The Stepford Wives, Find Me Guilty, Confessions of a Shopaholic, two sequels to Luc Besson's Arthur and the Invisibles, playing Armand Montgomery, father to Freddie Highmore's Arthur, and Jason Bourne.

Stanton appeared in episodes of the television shows Law & Order, Law & Order: Criminal Intent, Law & Order: Special Victims Unit, Frasier, Ed, Third Watch, Damages, NYC 22, The Good Wife, and Orange Is the New Black.

He also played Anthony “Robi” Frobisher, boss to mass killer Mr. Mercedes, in David E. Kelley’s 2017 television adaptation of Stephen King’s novel.

Filmography

Films
 The House on Carroll Street (1988) - Dionysus
 Double Exposure: The Story of Margaret Bourke-White (TV movie, 1989) - Lloyd-Smith
 Love or Money (1990) - Dudley 
 A League of Their Own (1992) - Western Union Delivery Man 
 Bob Roberts (1992) - Bart Macklerooney
 Dennis The Menace (1993) - Henry Mitchell 
 Don't Drink the Water  (TV movie, 1994) - Mr. Burns 
 Striptease (1996) - Erb Crandal
 Washington Square (1997) - Arthur Townsend 
 Hudson River Blues (1997) - Jeff 
 Red Corner (1997) - Ed Pratt 
 Next Stop Wonderland (1998) - Robert 
 Mercury Rising (1998) - Dean Crandell
 Happy Accidents (2000) - Fetishist
 The Quiet American (2002) - Joe Tunney 
 Head of State (2003) - Advisor
 The Stepford Wives (2004) - Ted Van Sant
 Find Me Guilty (2005) - Chris Newberger
 The Convention (short film, 2006) - Good Samaritan
 Gigantic (2008) - James Weathersby
 Confessions of a Shopaholic (2009) - Derek Smeath
 Arthur and the Revenge of Maltazard (French: Arthur et la vengeance de Maltazard, also known in English as Arthur and the Invisibles 2 or simply Arthur 2 as well as Arthur and the Great Adventure for its UK re-release) (2009) - Armand Montgomery
 Arthur 3: The War of the Two Worlds (French: Arthur et la guerre des deux mondes, also known in English as Arthur and the Invisibles 3 or simply Arthur 3 as well as Arthur and the Great Adventure for its UK re-release) (2010) - Armand Montgomery
 True Story (2015) - Jeffrey Gregg
 Jason Bourne (2016) - Government Lawyer

Television
 Law & Order (1991) - Jed Knox (episode "The Wages of Love")
 The Cosby Mysteries (1994-1995) - Medical Examiner John Chapman (14 episodes)
 Central Park West (also known as C.P.W.)  (1995) - Tom Chasen (2 episodes)
 Cosby (1996-1997) - Mr. Acker (2 episodes)
 Law & Order (1997) - Jacob Sutter  (episode "Harvest") 
 Frasier (1998) - Ben (episode "The Zoo Story") 
 Ed (2000) - Arthur Daily (episode "Just Friends")
 Third Watch (2001) - Donald Simkins (episode "Duty") 
 Law & Order: Criminal Intent  (2002) - Dennis Griscom (episode "The Third Horseman")
 Law & Order: Special Victims Unit (2003) - P.B.A. Representative (episode "Rotten") 
 Law & Order (2003) - Tim Grayson (episode "Seer")
 The Brotherhood of Poland, New Hampshire (2003) - Dr. Patz (episode "Secrets and Lies")
 Jonny Zero (2005) - Stuart (episode "Bounty")
 Law & Order (2006) - Douglas Preston (episode "Avatar")
 Law & Order: Criminal Intent (2010) as Mr. Nower, School Official (episode "Three-in-One")
 Damages (2011) as Pastor Stephen Yates (episode "Next One's on Me, Blondie") 
 NYC 22 (2012) as Steve Cowan (episode "Jumpers") 
 The Good Wife (2013) as Hugh Saxon (episode "Going for the Gold") 
 Orange Is the New Black (2013) as Maury Kind (2 episodes)
 Mr. Mercedes (2017) - Anthony "Robi" Frobisher (10 episodes)
 Pretty Little Liars: Original Sin (TBA) - Marshall Clanton (TBA)

Video Games
 Manhunt (2003) - Smilie member
 Bully (2006)  - Mr. Galloway

References

External links

1963 births
Living people
20th-century American male actors
21st-century American male actors
American male film actors
American male stage actors
American male television actors
American male video game actors
American male voice actors
Male actors from San Antonio
Male actors from Texas
Male actors from Virginia
People from Annandale, Virginia
Tisch School of the Arts alumni